Achinger is a Polish coat of arms. It was used by several szlachta families in the times of the Kingdom of Poland and the Polish–Lithuanian Commonwealth.

Notable bearers
Among the notable bearers was szlachcic Augustyn Aichinger originally from Nuremberg, business partner of Konstanty Korniakt (1520–1603) who made his fortune in international trade and became financial advisor to moldavian hospodar Alexandru Lăpușneanu. Aichinger was active in Wallachia, where he served also as Korniakt's business contact. Their immensely profitable deals under the reign of King Sigismund II Augustus covered most of Central and Eastern Europe from Turkey to Germany, based on large-scale trade in Greek wines, cotton, honey, skins and furs.

Other:

 Ajchingier family, Polish-German nobles
 Bażyński family (Baysen), Polish-German nobles
 Jan Bażyński, first Polish governor of Royal Prussia
 Gabriel Bażyński, Voivode of Chelmno

Gallery

See also
 Polish heraldry
 Heraldic family
 List of Polish nobility coats of arms

References

Bibliography
 Kasper Niesiecki: Herbarz Polski (Polish Armorial), Lwów, 1738
 Tadeusz Gajl: Herbarz polski od średniowiecza do XX wieku : ponad 4500 herbów szlacheckich 37 tysięcy nazwisk 55 tysięcy rodów. L&L, 2007. .
 Herbarz rodowy, Alfred Znamierowski, Warszawa 2004, 
 Józef Szymański: Herbarz rycerstwa polskiego z XVI wieku. Warszawa: DiG, 2001, s. 7. .

External links
 History of Achinger Coat of Arms in English
 Encyklopedia staropolska

Achinger